Newark Catholic High School is a private, Catholic co-educational high school located in Newark, Ohio in Licking County. It is operated by the Roman Catholic Diocese of Columbus.

Clubs and activities
The school's Latin Club functions as a local chapter of both the Ohio Junior Classical League (OJCL) and National Junior Classical League (NJCL).

Ohio High School Athletic Association State Championships

 Football - 1978, 1982, 1984, 1985, 1986, 1987, 1991, 2007  (fourth-most in OHSAA history)
 Baseball - 1988, 1989, 2002, 2003, 2004, 2006, 2013, 2015, 2016 
 Girls Track - 1987 
 Girls Volleyball - 1979, 1980, 1982, 1983, 1984, 1988, 1989, 2004 
 Girls Basketball – 1984

Notes and references

External links
 School Website

Roman Catholic Diocese of Columbus
High schools in Licking County, Ohio
Newark, Ohio
Catholic secondary schools in Ohio